Turbonilla amoena is a species of sea snail, a marine gastropod mollusk in the family Pyramidellidae, the pyrams and their allies.

Distribution
This species occurs in the following locations:
 Atlantic (Europe)
 Azores
 Canary Islands
 Cape Verde
 European waters (ERMS scope)
 Mediterranean Sea
 Morocco

Description
(Original description of Odostomia brevicula, Jeffreys, 1883) The conical shell is solid, opaque, and glossy. The sculpture is short, strong, straight. It shows rather sharp longitudinal ribs, of which there are about a dozen on the body whorl. They terminate abruptly at the periphery, which is bluntly angulated. The interstices of the ribs have an excavated appearance.  Under the microscope the whole surface is covered lengthwise with very fine and close-set striae. The apex is quite smooth and polished. The colour is clear white. The spire is short. It contains four whorls (besides the bulbous andh eterostrophe embryonic nucleus), compressed, and gradually enlarging. The body whorl is almost equal to half the spire. The suture is shallow and nearly straight. The aperture is oval, pointed at the base. The columella is curved. The tooth is small and indistinct, tubercular, placed on the upper part of the columella. There is no umbilicus.

References

 Warén A., 1980. Marine Mollusca described by John Gwyn Jeffreys, with the location of the type material. Conchological Society of Great Britain and Ireland. Special publication, 1. London, 60 pp
 Carrozza F. & Nofroni I., 1993. Sulla validità specifica di Turbonilla amoena (Monterosato, 1878) e sua priorità rispetto a Turbonilla compressa (Jeffreys, 1884)(Heterostropha: Pyramidellidae). Bollettino Malacologico,29: 97-191.
 Giannuzzi Savelli R., Micali P., Nofroni I. & Pusateri F. (2011) Odostomia brevicula Jeffreys, 1883 junior synonym of Turbonilla amoena (Monterosato, 1878) (Gastropoda, Heterobranchia, Pyramidellidae). Biodiversity Journal 2(4): 217-220.

External links
 To CLEMAM
 To Encyclopedia of Life

amoena
Gastropods described in 1878
Molluscs of the Atlantic Ocean
Molluscs of the Mediterranean Sea